This is a list of major stock exchange mergers and acquisitions in the Americas. It also features the name of any resultant stock exchanges from mergers or acquisitions. According to Robert E. Wright of Bloomberg in 2013, historians assert that "rather than exhibiting a trend of constant consolidation, the number of exchanges active across the globe has waxed and waned several times over the past 200 years... During periods of heightened regulation, political turmoil or communication advances, exchanges tend to fail or merge. Economic prosperity, increased financial speculation and high levels of market uncertainty, by contrast, drive new entries."

The National Stock Exchange ceased trading operations on May 30, 2014, bringing the number of active stock exchanges in the United States to 11. Wrote Bloomberg, that left "just one public exchange, Chicago Stock Exchange Inc., that isn’t owned BATS, Nasdaq OMX Group or IntercontinentalExchange Group Inc."

Major mergers or acquisitions

Canada
1901: Standard Stock Exchange merged with Standard Stock and Mining Exchange
1901: Toronto Mining Exchange merged with Standard Stock and Mining Exchange
1934: Standard Stock and Mining Exchange (Toronto) merged with Toronto Stock Exchange
1953: Montreal Curb Market merged with Canadian Stock Exchange
1974: Canadian Stock Exchange merged with Montreal Stock Exchange
Merged entity named Montreal Stock Exchange
November 1999: Aspect of Montreal Stock Exchange acquired by Canadian Venture Exchange
Name kept as Canadian Venture Exchange
November 1999: Alberta Stock Exchange acquired by Canadian Venture Exchange
Name kept as Canadian Venture Exchange
November 1999: Vancouver Stock Exchange acquired by Canadian Venture Exchange
Name kept as Canadian Venture Exchange
2007: Winnipeg Commodity Exchange merged with International Securities Exchange
2008: Boston Options Exchange acquired by Montreal Exchange
Name kept as Boston Options Exchange as subsidiary
2008: Montreal Stock Exchange merged with Toronto Stock Exchange

Mexico
14 June 1895: Bolsa de México (Stock Exchange of Mexico) merged with Bolsa Nacional (National Stock Exchange)
Name changed to Bolsa de México
1975: Guadalajara Stock Exchange acquired by Bolsa Mexicana de Valores (Mexican Stock Exchange)
Name changed to Bolsa Mexicana de Valores
1975: Monterrey Stock Exchange acquired by Bolsa Mexicana de Valores (Mexican Stock Exchange)
Name changed to Bolsa Mexicana de Valores

United States

1865: New York Gold Exchange acquired by the New York Stock Exchange
Name not changed as subsidiary
1869: Open Board of Stock Brokers merged with the New York Stock Exchange
Name retained as New York Stock Exchange (then the New York Stock and Exchange Board)
1877: New-York Open Gold and Stock Exchange acquired by the American Mining and Stock Exchange
Name retained as American Mining and Stock Exchange

1877: American Mining and Stock Exchange acquired by the New York Mining Stock Exchange
Name changed to New York Mining Stock Exchange
1883: National Petroleum Exchange acquired by the New York Mining Stock Exchange
Name changed to New-York Mining Stock and National Petroleum Exchange.
1885: New-York Petroleum Exchange and Stock Board merged with the New-York Mining and National Petroleum Exchange
Name changed to Consolidated Stock and Petroleum Exchange
September 1900: California Oil Exchange acquired by Los Angeles Stock Exchange
Name changed to Los Angeles Stock Exchange
1900: California Oil Exchange acquired by Producer's Oil Exchange
September 1909: Los Angeles Nevada Mining Exchange acquired by Los Angeles Stock Exchange
Name changed to Los Angeles Stock Exchange
1910: California Stock and Oil Exchange acquired by San Francisco Stock Exchange
1 October 1935: Seattle Curb and Mining Exchange acquired by Seattle Stock Exchange
Name changed to Seattle Stock Exchange
1938: San Francisco Curb Exchange absorbed by the San Francisco Stock Exchange
1949: Baltimore Stock Exchange merged with the Philadelphia Stock Exchange
Name changed to Philadelphia-Baltimore Stock Exchange
September 1949: St. Louis Stock Exchange acquired by Chicago Stock Exchange
Name changed to Midwest Stock Exchange
October 1949: Cleveland Stock Exchange acquired by Chicago Stock Exchange
Name changed to Midwest Stock Exchange
1949: Minneapolis-St. Paul Stock Exchange acquired by Chicago Stock Exchange
Name changed to Midwest Stock Exchange
1959: New Orleans Stock Exchange acquired by Midwest Stock Exchange
Name changed to Midwest Stock Exchange
1958: San Francisco Stock and Bond Exchange merged with Los Angeles Oil Exchange
Name changed to Pacific Coast Stock Exchange
1964: Washington Stock Exchange acquired by the Philadelphia-Baltimore Stock Exchange
Name changed to Philadelphia-Baltimore-Washington Stock Exchange
1969: Pittsburgh Stock Exchange  acquired by the Philadelphia-Baltimore-Washington Stock Exchange 
Name changed to Philadelphia Stock Exchange
1986: Intermountain Stock Exchange acquired by Commodity Exchange, Inc. (COMEX)
Intermountain Stock Exchange ceased operating and went dormant
1994: Commodity Exchange merged with New York Mercantile Exchange
1998: Coffee, Sugar and Cocoa Exchange merged with the New York Board of Trade
2005: Pacific Stock Exchange merged with NYSE
Name changed to NYSE Arca
2006: Archipelago acquired by NYSE Euronext
2007: Chicago Board of Trade merged with Chicago Mercantile Exchange
October 2, 2007: Boston Stock Exchange acquired by NASDAQ
Renamed NASDAQ OMX BX
July 24, 2008: Philadelphia Stock Exchange acquired by NASDAQ
Name changed to NASDAQ OMX PHLX
2008: Boston Options Exchange acquired by Montreal Exchange
Name kept as Boston Options Exchange
2008: American Stock Exchange absorbed by NYSE Euronext
Name changed to NYSE Alternext U.S.
2011: National Stock Exchange acquired by CBOE Stock Exchange
Both exchanges kept their separate names.
2014: Direct Edge merged with BATS Global Markets
Name changed to BATS Global Markets
February 2017: National Stock Exchange  acquired by the New York Stock Exchange
National Stock Exchange ceased, with plans to reopen under the NYSE.
2017: BATS Global Markets to be acquired by Chicago Board Options Exchange

See also
List of stock exchanges
List of stock exchanges in the Americas
List of former stock exchanges in the Americas

References

External links

Lists of stock exchanges